Michelle Kristine da Silva Alves (born September 19, 1978) is a Brazilian model.

Biography 

She was born in Londrina, Paraná, Brazil, as the daughter of a lawyer (mother) and an engineer (father). Alves was a student in civil engineering at Brazil's Londrina State University prior to moving to São Paulo, where she pursued modeling. She describes herself as "always a good student" and "Almost a nerd." She is also a polyglot, fluent in Portuguese, Italian, French and English. Alves is currently living in Los Angeles, California.

Career 

She was featured in the 2002 and 2003 editions of the Sports Illustrated Swimsuit Issue, appeared in two editions of the Victoria's Secret Fashion Show, and was also featured in their catalogs and their book celebrating the company's 10th anniversary, entitled Sexy.

Alves has signed contracts with Valentino, Christian Dior, Escada, Ralph Lauren, Missoni, Miss Sixty, Michael Kors, GAP, Emporio Armani, Michael Kors Swimwear, AKRIS and holds a deal with Yves Saint Laurent for their fragrance Cinéma's campaign.  She has worked with photographers such as Steven Meisel, Patrick Demarchelier, Bruce Weber, Gilles Bensimon, Mario Sorrenti, Nick Knight, Steven Klein, Phil Poynter, Walter Chin, Inez van Lamsweerde and Vinoodh Matadin and Richard Avedon.

Alves was featured on more than 100 covers of major fashion magazines, including international editions of Vogue, Elle, Marie Claire, French, Esquire, L'Officiel, Harper's Bazaar, Amica and Glamour.

References

External links

Theodora & Callum Interview with Michelle Alves

1978 births
Living people
People from Londrina
Brazilian female models
21st-century Brazilian women